Grey College Boat Club (GCBC) is the rowing club of Grey College at Durham University in northern England.

The club has over 60 members and shares its boathouse with Josephine Butler College Boat Club.
The club competes at a national, regional and college level, with notable success in 2010 at the annual Durham Regatta.

Boathouse and Fleet
Grey College Boat House is located at Dunelm House on the River Wear between Kingsgate Bridge and Elvet Bridge and is a ten-minute walk from Grey College. 

Grey College Boat Club own three VIIIs, 'Eric Halladay', 'Brian Seal', and 'Tom James'.

The club also own a number of IVs, and other smaller boats including a double scull named 'Whip-ma-whop-ma-gate' after the street in York.

The Men's 1st IV is a Stampfli  called 'Schilders, snel beser'. The Women's 1st IV is a Janousek called 'These Girls Can'. Another IV owned by the boat club is 'The Golden Phoenix', the unofficial symbol of the college adopted after a fire devastated the main accommodation block in March, 1959.

Racing Calendar
Grey College Boat Club compete throughout the year in many head races and regattas in the North East of England. Over the last few years, events competed in include:

2010 saw the first 24-hour indoor rowing marathon held against Collingwood College Boat Club. The charity event was jointly run by both clubs and raised money for Sport Relief as well as the two clubs concerned.

Durham Regatta 

Grey College Boat club has seen notable success in recent years at Durham Regatta. In 1995 the Men's Novice IV won the Lady Hershall Plate for the first time in over twenty years (Tock, C., Owens, L., Moxey, D., Blake, B. and Kelly, R. [cox]). In 2010, the Men's first VIII won both days of the regatta. In 2009, the Women's first IV won the novice event. In 2015, the Men's fresher IV won Maiden's Fours, an event within Durham Regatta open to first year Durham University students who have not rowed before.

Club structure

Any member of Grey College JCR, MCR or SCR is eligible to join Grey College Boat Club as an ordinary member. Any other student of Durham University may join with the permission of the President. The club is run by an executive committee elected by club members throughout the year. The executive committee is composed of the President, Men's Captain, Women's Captain, Men's Vice Captain, Women's Vice Captain, Treasurer, Boatman and Welfare Officer.

Grey College Boat Club holds an annual Ball each year in Epiphany term which is the highlight of the boat club's social calendar. At this event, a formal thank you to out-going members of the executive committee is offered and results of the current and previous seasons are celebrated.

See also
Durham College Rowing
Grey College, Durham
University rowing (UK)

References

External links
 Grey College Boat Club Website
 Grey College Junior Common Room

Durham University Rowing Clubs
Sports clubs established in 1959
1959 establishments in England